"Duncan" is a song by the American singer-songwriter Paul Simon. It was the third and final single from his second self-titled studio album (1972), released on Columbia Records. The song was also released as a single in July 1972 as "Duncan" b/w "Run That Body Down".

A ballad in E-minor, "Duncan" tells the story of Lincoln Duncan, a fisherman's son. An inability to fall asleep in a cheap motel due to the loud sex that a couple is having next door sends Duncan off on a long reverie.  He recalls his decision to leave "the boredom and the chowder" of his hometown in the Canadian Maritime Provinces and head towards New England. He recalls running out of money, losing his confidence and faith in himself, and gaining them back after losing his virginity to a young female street preacher – "just like a dog I was befriended".  The cult Children of God, later known as the Family International, founded by David Berg used girls and women in their group to proselytize towards the cult with sex, sometimes referred to as, "Happy Hookers for Christ".  The cult referred to this as, "Flirty Fishing," in.  This verse may describe an encounter with one of these girls.  In the last stanza he is lying on the ground at night playing his guitar and thanking God for his fingers.  Between the stanzas, the song features instrumental interludes, played on 2 flutes, by Los Incas, an Andean group which had previously collaborated with Simon & Garfunkel on "El Condor Pasa (If I Could)" in 1970.

Cash Box said that "the instrumental bridge is straight out of the Pied Piper mystique."

"Duncan" peaked at No. 52 on the Billboard Pop Singles chart in 1972.

A concert rendition featuring Urubamba performing the interludes was included on the 1974 album Paul Simon in Concert: Live Rhymin'.  It gained radio airplay itself, and has gone on to become a semi-regular on satellite radio's Deep Tracks station. Simon has included the song in his set lists for some subsequent tours as well.

A demo version of the song appears as a bonus on the 2004 CD rerelease of the album.  This version is shorter and faster, and has very different lyrics, yet displays the same melancholy tone as the released version.

The song was used in the 2006 film 10 Items or Less.

During a show in Toronto on May 7, 2011, Rayna Ford, a fan from Conception Bay, Newfoundland and Labrador, called out for Simon to play the song, and said something to the effect that she learned to play guitar on the song. Paul Simon invited her on stage, handed her a guitar and asked her to play it for the crowd.

Personnel
 Paul Simon – vocals, acoustic guitar, arranger, producer
 Los Incas – flute, charango, percussion

Charts

Notes

References

Sources

 
 

Paul Simon songs
1972 singles
Songs written by Paul Simon
Song recordings produced by Roy Halee
Song recordings produced by Paul Simon
Columbia Records singles